Hero is the 5th album by Swedish singer Charlotte Perrelli, released on 23 April 2008. The album includes the song "Hero" which was Sweden's entry in the Eurovision Song Contest 2008. The album also includes the radio single "Addicted" and the digital single "Bullet". The song "Appreciate" was originally recorded by Nick Jonas for his 2004 album Nicholas Jonas and is written by former Busted star James Bourne.

Track listing

Release history
The album was released both digitally and physically on 23 April 2008.

Charts

Weekly charts

Year-end charts

References

2008 albums
Charlotte Perrelli albums